Trachysomus fragifer is a species of beetle in the family Cerambycidae. It was described by William Kirby in 1818. It is known from Paraguay and Brazil.

References

Onciderini
Beetles described in 1818